The Burial of Drowned Persons Act 1808, also known as Grylls' Act, is an Act of the Parliament of the United Kingdom (citation 48 Geo III c.75). The act provides that unclaimed bodies of dead persons cast ashore from the sea should be removed by the churchwardens and overseers of the parish, and decently interred in consecrated ground.

The passage of the 1808 act was one of the consequences of the wreck of the Royal Navy frigate HMS Anson in Mount's Bay in 1807. Prior to the passage of this act it was customary to unceremoniously bury drowned seamen without shroud or coffin, in unconsecrated ground. However the burial in this manner of the many dead from the Anson, and the length of time that many of the bodies remained unburied, caused controversy and led to a local solicitor, Thomas Grylls, drafting a new law to provide more decent treatment for drowned seamen. This law was introduced to parliament by John Hearle Tremayne, Member of Parliament for Cornwall, and was enacted in 1808.

A monument to the drowned sailors, and to the passing of Grylls' Act, stands above Loe Bar, near Porthleven, Cornwall. The construction of nearby Porthleven harbour, was another of the consequences of the loss of the Anson.

This act was amended by the Burial of Drowned Persons Act 1886 (citation 49 & 50 Vict c.20), to extend its applicability to bodies found in, or cast on shore from, all tidal or navigable waters.   This was needed following the case of the wreck of the Princess Alice, when various parishes refused to pay the cost of interment. The parish was responsible for burial, under the Burial of Drowned Persons Act, and a fee of 5 shillings (a crown) was also paid by the parish for the recovery of drowned bodies.

References

Burials in the United Kingdom
Legal aspects of death
Porthleven
Repealed United Kingdom Acts of Parliament
United Kingdom Acts of Parliament 1808
United Kingdom Acts of Parliament 1886